Ossi-Petteri Grönholm (born September 17, 1981 in Kotka, Finland) is a Finnish professional ice hockey defenceman. After playing for Pelicans and SaiPa of the Finnish SM-liiga and Frölunda HC of the Swedish Elite League, he signed with Oulun Kärpät for two years in spring 2008.

Career statistics

External links

1981 births
Brynäs IF players
Finnish ice hockey defencemen
Frölunda HC players
HPK players
KooKoo players
Lahti Pelicans players
Living people
Malmö Redhawks players
Oulun Kärpät players
People from Kotka
SaiPa players
Sportspeople from Kymenlaakso